Max Westerkamp (October 8, 1912 in Tandjong Pura, Sumatra, Dutch East Indies – May 6, 1970 in Enschede) was a Dutch field hockey player who competed in the 1936 Summer Olympics.

He was a member of the Dutch field hockey team, which won the bronze medal. He played all five matches as back.

External links
 
profile

1912 births
1970 deaths
Dutch male field hockey players
Olympic field hockey players of the Netherlands
Field hockey players at the 1936 Summer Olympics
Olympic bronze medalists for the Netherlands
Olympic medalists in field hockey
People from Langkat Regency
Medalists at the 1936 Summer Olympics